Vedro Polje, which translates as Clear Field in English, may refer to:

 Vedro Polje, Croatia, a village near Sunja
 Vedro Polje, Bosanski Petrovac, a village in Bosnia and Herzegovina
 Vedro Polje, Bugojno, a village in Bosnia and Herzegovina